Year 1422 (MCDXXII) was a common year starting on Thursday (link will display the full calendar) of the Julian calendar.

Events 
 January–December 
 January 10 – Hussite Wars – Battle of Deutschbrod: The Hussites defeat 2,000 Royalist Crusaders.
 March 21–May 2 – Hundred Years' War – Siege of Meaux: Meaux surrenders to the English.
 June 10–September – The Ottoman sultan Murad II besieges Constantinople; the siege is broken off as a result of the rebellion of Küçük Mustafa.
 August 22 – Use of the Spanish era dating system in the Kingdom of Portugal ceases.
 September 1 – Henry VI becomes King of England, aged nine months.
 September 27 – The Teutonic Knights sign the Treaty of Melno with the Kingdom of Poland and Grand Duchy of Lithuania, after the brief Gollub War. The Prussian–Lithuanian border established by the treaty remains unchanged, until World War I.
 October 21 – With the death of King Charles VI of France, Henry VI of England is proclaimed King of France in Paris, while his maternal uncle, the Dauphin, Charles, is proclaimed King Charles VII of France in Bourges.

 Undated 
 Ottoman forces overrun the last domains of Constantine II of Bulgaria, who dies in exile at the Serbian court, ending the Bulgarian Empire.
 On the Italian Peninsula, Venice has a population of 84,000, of which 200 men rule the city, while Florence has a population of 40,000, of which 600 men rule the city.

Births 
 March 8 – Jacopo Piccolomini-Ammannati, Italian Catholic cardinal (d. 1479)
 June 7 – Federico da Montefeltro, Duke of Urbino (d. 1482)
 October 5 – Catherine, Princess of Asturias, Spanish royal (d. 1424)
 November 27 – Gaston IV, Count of Foix, French nobleman from Bearn (d. 1472)
 November 29 – Thomas Percy, 1st Baron Egremont, English baron (d. 1460)
 date unknown – Abul-Qasim Babur Mirza, Timurid ruler in Khurasan (d. 1457)
 probable – William Caxton, English printer (d. c. 1491)
 approximate – Agnès Sorel, French courtier, mistress of Charles VII of France (d. 1450)

Deaths 
 March 9 – Jan Želivský, Hussite priest (executed) (b. 1380) 
 July 8 – Michelle of Valois, French princess and duchess consort of Burgundy (b. 1395)
 August 31 – King Henry V of England (b. 1386)
 September 17 – Emperor Constantine II of Bulgaria (b. after 1370)
 October 21 – King Charles VI of France (b. 1368)
 probable – Thomas Walsingham, English chronicler

References